Monster is the fifteenth studio album by the Japanese rock duo B'z, released on June 28, 2006. The album sold over 401,000 copies in its first week, an improvement from 2005's "The Circle". In total the album sold over 537,091 copies.

Track listing
"ALL-OUT ATTACK" - 4:11
"SPLASH!" - 3:33
"ゆるぎないものひとつ" [Yuruginai Mono Hitotsu] [One Unwavering Thing] - 4:38
"恋のサマーセッション" [Koi no SAMA- SESSHON → Koi no SUMMER SESSION] [Love's SUMMER SESSION] - 3:28
"ケムリの世界" [KEMURI no Sekai] [World of SMOKE] - 3:05
"衝動 ~MONSTER MiX~" [Shoudou ~MONSTER MiX~] [Impulse ~MONSTER MiX~] - 3:16
"無言のPromise" [Mugon no Promise] [Wordless Promise] - 4:57
"MONSTER" - 4:53
"ネテモサメテモ" [NETEMOSAMETEMO] [In Sleeping, and in Waking] - 3:26
"Happy Birthday" - 3:54
"ピエロ" [PIERO → PIERROT] - 3:13
"雨だれぶるーず" [Amadare Buru-zu → Amadare Blues] [Raindrop Blues] - 6:17
"明日また陽が昇るなら" [Ashita Mata Hi ga Noboru Nara] [If the Sun Comes Up Again Tomorrow] - 4:52
"OCEAN ~2006 MiX~" - 5:26

Personnel
Tak Matsumoto (guitar)
Koshi Inaba (vocals)

Certifications

References

External links
B'z official Web site (in Japanese)

B'z albums
Being Inc. albums
Monster
Japanese-language albums